Piekło may refer to the following places:
Piekło, Lesser Poland Voivodeship (south Poland)
Piekło, Opole Voivodeship (south-west Poland)
Piekło, Świętokrzyskie Voivodeship (south-central Poland)
Piekło, Kartuzy County in Pomeranian Voivodeship (north Poland)
Piekło, Kościerzyna County in Pomeranian Voivodeship (north Poland)
Piekło, Sztum County in Pomeranian Voivodeship (north Poland)
Piekło, Warmian-Masurian Voivodeship (north Poland)